Sappy Bull Fighters is a 1959 short subject directed by Jules White starring American slapstick comedy team The Three Stooges (Moe Howard, Larry Fine, and Joe Besser in his final starring role). It is the 190th and final entry in the series released by Columbia Pictures starring the comedians between 1934 and 1959.

Plot 
The Stooges are vaudeville entertainers who trek to Mexico to perform their burlesque bullfight, with Joe as the brave matador, and Moe and Larry dressed in a bull costume. Unfortunately, their gig is canceled when they arrive. According to the trio, the manager fired them after they refused to do 10 additional shows for free. With no money to return home, the Stooges are stranded. Feeling bad for them, attractive señorita Greta (Greta Thyssen) gets the boys a gig at the local bull ring. However, when she leaves Greta mistakenly takes the trio's suitcase instead of hers. When they go retrieve it, however, Joe becomes attracted to Greta and begins to kiss her, infuriating her insanely jealous husband José (George J. Lewis).

The next day, the Stooges perform their act successfully at a bullring José recognizes the trio. In an act of revenge he pays the bullring attendant (Joe Palma) to release a live bull into the ring. Moe and Larry flee, but Joe is unaware of the switch. He eventually head-butts the wild animal, and is paraded out of the ring to the rousing cheers of "¡Ole, Americano!"

Cast

Credited
 Moe Howard as Moe
 Larry Fine as Larry
 Joe Besser as Joe (final film role)
 Greta Thyssen as Greta
 George J. Lewis as José

Uncredited
 Joe Palma as bullring attendant and spectator
 Harold Breen as spectator and stagehand
 Cy Schindell and Eddie Laughton as bullring attendants (both stock footage; both had died by this time)
 Manuel Granada as bullfight announcer (stock footage)

Production notes 
Sappy Bull Fighters is a reworking of 1942's What's the Matador?, a parody of the 1941 film Blood and Sand. Minimal recycled footage from the original was used, including long shots and voice tracks of Curly Howard riding the bull. The film begins with an inside joke: an advertising poster promotes the Stooges, and the bottom of the poster lists another performer, one "Julio Blanco" (the Spanish approximation of producer-director Jules White).

The remake was filmed over two days in mid-1957 (July 15–16, 1957), and marks Joe Besser's screen farewell as a Stooge: it was the last Stooge short released to theaters. The films Besser made with the Stooges were released out of sequence. The last short in which Besser worked was actually Flying Saucer Daffy, filmed in December 1957; after this last film was finished, Besser left the act to tend to his ailing wife. Besser would be succeeded by fellow Columbia two-reel comedian Joe DeRita (as "Curly Joe") in the trio's subsequent projects.

By the time  Sappy Bull Fighters was released in June 1959, the Stooges were experiencing a rebirth in popularity, due to the release of their shorts on television. In essence, the theatrical release of Sappy Bull Fighters actually competed with the enormously successful television revival.

At 15:12 Sappy Bull Fighters is the shortest film the team made at Columbia Pictures. The longest is A Pain in the Pullman (1936) at 19:46.

References

External links 
 
 
Sappy Bull Fighters at threestooges.net

1959 films
1959 comedy films
The Three Stooges films
American black-and-white films
The Three Stooges film remakes
Films directed by Jules White
Bullfighting films
Films set in Mexico
Columbia Pictures short films
1950s English-language films
1950s American films